Amantis nawai is a small species of praying mantis native to eastern Asia.

Description
Females: , micropterous
Males:  in length, micropterous or macropterous

Distribution
It is found in China, Sri Lanka, and Taiwan; in Japan on Honshu, Shikoku, Kyushu, and Okinawa, and South Korea.

Habitat
They are found on the forest floor and low trees, where they eat insects such as ants. Often found around Machilus thunbergii and Castanopsis sieboldii, and other lush vegetation shaded by broadleaf evergreen trees and large rocks.

Oothecae are found on rocks and tree bark.

References

nawai
Mantodea of Asia
Insects of China
Insects of Japan
Insects of Korea
Insects of Sri Lanka
Insects of Taiwan
Invertebrates of Korea
Insects described in 1908